Dillon Mountain is a prominent 4,820-foot (1,469 meter) mountain summit located in the Philip Smith Mountains of the Brooks Range, in the U.S. state of Alaska. The peak was named after John Thomas Dillon (1947-1987), a geologist with the Alaska Division of Geological and Geophysical Surveys who mapped the geology of the southern Brooks Range mineral belt.  He died tragically with his father, Stephen Patrick Dillon, in an airplane crash in the Brooks Range while returning home from field work in July 1987. The name was officially adopted in 1990 by the U.S. Board on Geographic Names. This landmark is notable for its massive west face composed of Skajit limestone rising nearly 3,400 feet (1,035 m) above the surrounding valley.

Climate

Based on the Köppen climate classification, Dillon Mountain is located in a subarctic climate zone with long, cold, winters, and short, cool summers. Temperatures can drop below −30 °C with wind chill factors below −50 °C. The months June through August offer the most favorable weather for viewing and climbing.

See also

List of mountain peaks of Alaska
Geography of Alaska

References

External links

 Weather forecast: Dillon Mountain

Mountains of Alaska
Landforms of Yukon–Koyukuk Census Area, Alaska
Brooks Range
North American 1000 m summits